Byron Bekker (born 2 July 1987, in Johannesburg) is a former motorcycle speedway rider from South Africa, who rode in the British Premier League.

Career
Bekker started his British racing career in 2005 with Newcastle Gems where he rode seven meetings. He was quickly offered a contract with the clubs Premier League team, Newcastle Diamonds. However, with the Gems not having a team in the following season, he was sent to ride for Scunthorpe Scorpions in the Conference League to gain further experience. He made his debut at Sittingbourne Crusaders where he claimed a four ride paid maximum. The following weekend he scored eight on his home debut and five at Newport in two narrow victories. He was also three times within one point of a maximum around the Scunthorpe Raceway whilst his 8+3 points from five rides at Stoke Spitfires helped the club to a close one-point victory.

He rode in all 28 meetings that remained during the 2005 season and in the 2006 season he was the only ever-present in the side when his average (CMA) moved up to 6.67 from all meetings. He collected two maxima at home, against Newport and Weymouth Wildcats.

He scored sixteen points at the Norfolk Arena in King's Lynn as the Scorpions won the Lincolnshire Cup against Boston Barracudas.

References

1987 births
Living people
South African speedway riders
Edinburgh Monarchs riders
Scunthorpe Scorpions riders